Cychrus rugicollis is a species of ground beetle in the subfamily of Carabinae. It was described by K. & J. Daniel in 1898.

References

beetles described in 1898
rugicollis